Moonglow is a fictional character appearing in American comic books published by Marvel Comics. She was a member of a team of superheroes, Squadron Supreme.

The Supreme Squadron members exist in numerous alternate universes, but their main and original timeline is Earth-712.

Publication history
Like most of the newer Redeemer characters she is based on existing DC Comics team, The Detroit-based Justice League of America, in this case the character of Gypsy.

Fictional character biography

Melissa Hanover
Melissa Hanover was recruited by Nighthawk to serve in his team of subversive super powered "Redeemers" to fight the influence of the Squadron Supreme's "Utopia Program". She had the ability to project illusions. Melissa Hanover was rather insecure, and used her powers to make herself look beautiful and glamorous, to hide her unattractive appearance. She joined the Squadron to help overthrow it from within. She stole the plans for the behavior modification device, then openly joined the Redeemers' battle against the Squadron Supreme.

When the team left to confront the Nth Man, Melissa Hanover turned over the Moonglow identity to Arcanna and agreed to let Arcanna go in her place.

Arcanna

Arcanna Jones, working initially as a medium, started an activity as a professional crimefighter and adventurer, and the Squadron Supreme asked her to join the group as Arcanna. With the Squadron, she was brainwashed by the Overmind, and battled the Defenders. She was cured, and battled the Overmind and Null, the Living Darkness alongside the Defenders.

She joined in the Squadron decision to assume control of their Earth's United States, but abstained on the Squadron vote to use the behavior modification machine and become involved in its "Utopia Program." She learned she was pregnant and felt she could not take an active role. Her husband and children were captured by the Institute of Evil. With the Squadron, she defeated the Institute and freed the captives, and told the Squadron she was pregnant.

Later, during the Nth Man's attack (who tried to consume the Squadron's universe) she tried to re-join the team. Because she'd had a child just a week previously, Arcanna was forbidden by Power Princess to go; so using her own illusionary abilities, she assumed the guise of Moonglow. With the Squadron, she attempted to save her universe from the Nth Man; however in the process, her son became the new Nth Man, exchanging minds with Thomas Lightner.

The Squadron (and Arcanna) saved their universe, paying the price of exile in an alternate universe (the mainstream Marvel Universe, also named Earth-616). While there, they met Quasar and relocated to Project: Pegasus.

Powers and abilities
Moonglow had the ability to cast convincing three dimensional audio-visual-olfactory-tactile illusions by modifying the perceptions of other beings. She was able to alter her appearance as well as others', in order to manipulate or confuse. She cannot maintain her illusions when unconscious, nor can she affect machines, such as cameras. She could use her powers to create the illusion of artificial high or low gravity (the latter of which caused Arcanna extreme distress while she was in labor).

She is a fair hand-to-hand combatant, having received coaching from Nighthawk and Power Princess.

References

External links
http://www.marvel.com/universe/Moonglow_%28Melissa_Hanover%29_%28Earth-712%29
http://www.marvel.com/universe/Moonglow_%28Arcanna_Jones%29_%28Earth-712%29

Characters created by Mark Gruenwald
Comics characters introduced in 1986
Fictional illusionists
Marvel Comics female superheroes
Marvel Comics superheroes
Squadron Supreme